Magnus Jonsson (born in Sollefteå on ) is a Swedish biathlete.

Jonsson competed in the 2010 Winter Olympics for Sweden. He finished 79th in the sprint.

As of February 2013, his best performance at the Biathlon World Championships, is 4th, as part of the 2011 Swedish men's relay team. His best individual performance is 15th, in the 2009 pursuit.

As of February 2013, he has won one Biathlon World Cup medal, a silver with the Swedish men's relay team at Hochfilzen in 2008/09 season. His best individual finish is 10th, in the pursuit at Kontiolahti in 2009/10. His best overall finish in the Biathlon World Cup is 56th, in both 2008/09 and 2011/12.

World Cup Podiums

References 

1982 births
Biathletes at the 2010 Winter Olympics
Swedish male biathletes
Living people
Olympic biathletes of Sweden
People from Sollefteå Municipality
21st-century Swedish people